Gregor is a surname, and may refer to:

 A. James Gregor (1929–2019), professor of political science known for his writings on fascism and security issues
 Bob Gregor (born 1957), American football player
 Francis Gregor (MP) (1760–1815), MP for the County of Cornwall, brother of William
 Michael Gregor (1888—1953), aircraft engineer
 Noah Gregor (born 1998), ice hockey player
 Valentin Gregor (born 1963), jazz violinist, singer and composer
 Walter Gregor (1825–1897), folklorist
 William Gregor (1761–1817), British clergyman and mineralogist who discovered the elemental metal titanium, brother of Francis

See also
 Gregor (disambiguation)
 Gregor (given name)
 Gregory (surname)

Surnames from given names